Sigrun Tara Øverland (born 24 December 1983 in Kristiansand, Norway) is a Norwegian musician (vocals, guitar, lyre, autoharp, among others), lyricist, songwriter and music producer.

Career 
Øverland graduated in music performance at the Agder University College (2003–05), where she initiated the band Tara (established 2003) with Guro Skumsnes Moe and Gunnar Sæter, and the duo Picidae (established 2004) with Eirik Dørsdal, both bands with album releases. She has also participated in other projects like Kaada, Anne Marie Almedal, and Evan Seleven.

After further studies in administration at the Norwegian Academy of Music, she was general manager of AKKS in Oslo, a music organization working balance in the music industry. She has also been head of the concert association Havre backpack. She now works as a producer for the cultural center  in Sortland, Norway.

Discography

Fronting 
 With Tara
2006: Plain As Coal (Bergland Production)

 With Picidae
 2016: It's Another Wor d (NorCD)

Backing 
 With Novac.
 2004: Sex, Drugs & Ragtime (self-released)

 With Anne Marie Almedal
2007: The Siren And The Sage (+47, Warner Music Norway), on the tune "Joy"
2010: Blue Sky Blue (+47), on the tune "Seize My Heart"
2010: Memory Lane (+47), on the tune "May You Never"

References

External links 
 

21st-century Norwegian multi-instrumentalists
21st-century Norwegian women singers
21st-century Norwegian singers
Norwegian singer-songwriters
Norwegian guitarists
Musicians from Kristiansand
1983 births
Living people
University of Agder alumni
21st-century Norwegian guitarists
21st-century women guitarists